Breaking News Network is a subscriber service news alerts services with offices based in Midland Park, New Jersey. Created by a group of former firefighters, and communications professionals, the service listens to police and firefighter scanners and send out breaking news alerts in real time. Local and national journalists, rescue workers, and state agencies then receive the alerts via mobile application about automobile crashes, fires, and crimes as they occur. This gives them the opportunity to respond to them, and cover these important stories. The service is open to anyone who subscribes to it. Desk Reporters are employed 24/7 to monitor the radio traffic and pick out newsworthy information.

References

External links

Television networks in the United States